1946 Emperor's Cup Final was the 26th final of the Emperor's Cup competition. The final was played at University of Tokyo Goten-Shita Stadium in Tokyo on May 5, 1946. University of Tokyo LB won the championship.

Overview
University of Tokyo LB won the championship, by defeating Kobe University of Economics Club 6–2.

Match details

See also
1946 Emperor's Cup

References

Emperor's Cup
1946 in Japanese football